Soul Symphony is the final album by jazz group The Three Sounds featuring performances with an orchestra arranged and conducted by Monk Higgins recorded in 1969 and released on the Blue Note label.

Reception
The Allmusic review by Thom Jurek awarded the album 3 stars stating "Soul Symphony is far from a throwaway; it's a deeply grooved-out tough record with all of the Three Sounds magic on full view, and is highly recommended to any fan of soul-jazz or beat hunting".

Track listing
All compositions by Monk Higgins except as indicated
 "Soul Symphony" - 25:55 
 "Repeat After Me" - 6:43 
 "Upper Four Hundred" (Dee Ervin, Higgins) - 4:04 
 "Popsicle Pimp" (Ervin, Higgins) 2:57 
 "Black Sugar" (Ervin, Higgins) - 4:15
Recorded at Liberty Studios in West Hollywood, California on August 26 (tracks 2-6) and August 27 (track 1), 1969

Personnel
Gene Harris - piano
Henry Franklin - bass
Carl Burnett - drums
Monk Higgins - arranger, conductor
David Duke, Art Maebe - french horn
Buddy Collette - flute, alto flute
Fred Robinson - guitar
Alan Estes - percussion
Unidentified string section led by Jim Getzof (track 1) and Sid Sharp (tracks 2-6)
Alex Brown, Mamie Galore, Clydie King - backing vocals

References

Blue Note Records albums
The Three Sounds albums
1969 albums
Albums conducted by Monk Higgins
Albums arranged by Monk Higgins
Albums produced by Monk Higgins